Bulletproof Monk is a 2003 American superhero comedy film directed by Paul Hunter in his feature film directorial debut, and starring Chow Yun-fat, Seann William Scott, and Jaime King. The film is loosely based on the comic book written by Brett Lewis with art by Michael Avon Oeming. The film was shot in Toronto and Hamilton, Canada, and other locations that resemble New York City.

Plot 
In 1943 Tibet, a young monk is told that he has fulfilled a series of prophecies that mark him as his master's successor. Forgoing his name, the monk is entrusted with guarding a scroll with the power to keep whoever possesses it powerful, young, and immune to injury, yet could bring about disaster in the wrong hands. The monk is forced to flee when Nazi German soldiers, led by Colonel Strucker, attack his temple and murder his master. Sixty years later, the nameless monk encounters a young pickpocket named Kar fleeing from police, witnessing his selfless nature when the two are forced to save a young girl from an oncoming train. The monk begins following Kar, suspecting he may make for a suitable successor for the scroll. When Kar finds himself at odds with a local gang, he encounters and falls for a roguish young woman named Jade.

The following day, Jade attends an exhibition at a human rights museum presided over by Strucker's granddaughter, Nina; Jade speaks with her and grows suspicious, not knowing that she secretly spearheads her elderly grandfather's ongoing hunt for the scroll. Jade chances upon Kar being lectured by the monk and asks him to return her necklace, which he had stolen to earn her esteem. The meeting is interrupted when the monk is spotted by Nina's mercenaries. With Kar's help, the monk arrives at a laundromat that secretly houses a group of monks who provide him shelter, and the monk offers to train him as thanks. 

While Kar and the monk train in an abandoned warehouse, Nina's mercenaries come down on them in force. In the ensuing chase, Kar accidentally drops the scroll from the rooftop, where it's taken by Nina; however, she later discovers the scroll is a fake. Angered, Nina visits Kar's home to track the pair down, murdering his employer. The monk abandons Kar out of shame, but Kar, filled with newfound purpose, reunites with him at the laundromat. When an ambitious monk betrays the location of their hideout to Nina, the pair are forced to flee once again. The remaining monks are taken to Strucker's secret facility beneath the museum and forced into Strucker's memory-extracting torture devices.

Seeking help, Kar and the monk visit Jade at her home, learning that she is the daughter of an imprisoned crime lord. The monk realizes that this fact, coupled with a small scuffle between Kar and Jade inside the house, has fulfilled the second prophecy. Moments later, the monk is shot with a tranquilizer dart by Nina, who bursts in alongside her men. After discovering that the scroll's true text is tattooed onto the monk's body, Nina orders that he be taken alive. With her darkest suspicions of Nina confirmed, Jade surmises where the monk was taken and chooses to help rescue him. While the monk awakens to Nina sensually undressing him and scanning his tattoos, Kar and Jade arm themselves with Jade's arsenal of explosives.

Strucker begins reading from the scroll, but is interrupted when Jade and Kar launch an explosive attack on the museum, taking out most of Strucker's guards in the blast. The two infiltrate the facility through an underground water main, where Kar is swept away by a sudden rush of water. Left on her own, Jade is intercepted in the sewers by Nina, this time dressed in a tight military-style jumpsuit and concealing a sai. Despite Nina's advantage, Jade defeats her in humiliating fashion. Jade sucker-punches the horrified Nina before she can plead for her life, quickly pulling her half-conscious body into a chokehold and snapping her neck.

Strucker regains his youth after reading from the scroll; however, he finds that the last verse is missing. Before Strucker can scan the monk's brain for it, Kar arrives and distracts him, allowing the monk to break free. While Jade works to free the other monks, the nameless monk fights Strucker alongside Kar, knocking him off of the roof and onto live electrical wires. Believing Strucker had been dealt with, the pair reunite with Jade inside the museum. The power of the scroll transfers to Kar, as he has fulfilled the third prophecy. Strucker, still alive, attempts to kill the three, but is killed himself by a falling statue. Kar is surprised to find Jade alive after seemingly being shot by Strucker; like Kar, she also fulfilled the three prophecies, and the scroll's power transferred to her as well, thus making both of them a dyad of the scroll. The monk, now aged, meets with Kar and Jade the next day, giving each one half of the final verse, deeming them inseparable. The pair wish him a good vacation from his duties before departing to fulfill their new roles.

Cast 
 Chow Yun-fat as Monk with No Name
 Seann William Scott as Kar
 Jaime King as Jade "Bad Girl" Kerensky
 Karel Roden as Strucker
 Victoria Smurfit as Nina Strucker
 Roger Yuan as Master Monk
 Mako as Mr. Kojima
 Marcus Jean Pirae as "Funktastic"
 Russell Yuen as Brother Tenzin

Production 
In May 2000, it was announced MGM had paid high six figures against a potential seven-figure deal to turn the cult comic Bulletproof Monk into a live-action film that would star Chow Yun-fat as the title character with John Woo and Terence Chang’s Lion Rock Productions producing. Seann William Scott was cast in November 2001.

A video game adaptation was in development by Mucky Foot Productions for Empire Interactive but it was cancelled.

Reception

Box office 
The film grossed approximately $23 million in the United States, with a worldwide total of $37 million, less than the production budget of $52 million.

Critical response 

On Rotten Tomatoes, the film has an approval rating of  based on  reviews.  The site's consensus reads: "Venerable action star Chow Yun-Fat is the only saving grace in this silly action flick that more often than not resembles a commercial in style." On Metacritic it has a score of 40% based on reviews from 29 critics, indicating "mixed or average reviews". Audiences surveyed by CinemaScore gave the film a grade B on scale of A to F.

Roger Ebert of the Chicago Sun-Times gave it 2 out of 4 stars and wrote: "The fight scenes in Bulletproof Monk are not as inventive as some I've seen (although the opening fight on a rope bridge is so well done that it raises expectations it cannot fulfill)." Robert Koehler of Variety wrote "adults will likely object to the innumerable plot question marks coming off the screen like so many kung-fu kicks to the head." Koehler compared the film to Hong Kong action movies, noting that the fights are relatively tame, but the visual effects are generally excellent. Jamie Russell at the BBC gave it 3/5 stars and called it "Truly naff, but endearingly silly."

David Edelstein of Slate contended that Bulletproof Monk was "Crouching Tiger, Hidden Dragon for the American Pie audience"; panning its poor special effects and cinematography (the former he compared to an "afternoon Japanese kiddie series"), and concluded that "they made a ton of junky movies in Hong Kong, but those were dazzlingly fluid and high-flying junky movies. This American retread has the same sort of hack plot but none of the bravura. It makes them look like monkeys, and not bulletproof ones." Bill Stamets of the Chicago Reader panned Bulletproof Monk for having "routine" fight scenes and juvenile humor, and that "the film plays off Chow's imperturbable persona, but the Tibetan philosophy boils down to the paradox of hot dogs coming ten to a package while buns are sold in sets of eight."

References

External links 
MGM Studios page

 

2003 films
2000s action comedy films
2000s buddy films
2003 fantasy films
2003 martial arts films
2000s buddy comedy films
2000s superhero films
American action comedy films
American buddy action films
American martial arts films
American superhero films
Films scored by Éric Serra
Films based on Image Comics
Films about Tibet
Films based on American comics
Films shot in Hamilton, Ontario
Films shot in Toronto
Lakeshore Entertainment films
Live-action films based on comics
Martial arts comedy films
Martial arts fantasy films
2003 directorial debut films
2003 comedy films
Films set in a movie theatre
Films directed by Paul Hunter (director)
2000s English-language films
2000s American films